Metro TV may refer to:
 Metro TV (Ghana), a privately owned free-to-air television station
 Metro TV (Indonesian TV network), a 24-hour news channel